Auberge d'Allemagne was an auberge in Valletta, Malta. It was built between 1571 and 1575 to house knights of the Order of Saint John from the langue of Germany.

It was vacated in 1798 when the Order was expelled during the French occupation of Malta. By the 1830s, the building was used as the residence of the Chief Justice. Another part was used by the Mediterranean Fleet as a bakery and a mill.

It was demolished in 1839 to make way for St Paul's Pro-Cathedral. Auberge d'Allemagne was the only auberge in Malta to be intentionally demolished, since the other destroyed auberges were pulled down due to damage sustained in World War II. Some remains may still exist in situ.

The auberge was designed by the Maltese architect Girolamo Cassar, but almost nothing is known about the structure.

Further reading
L'Albergia della Lingua d'Alemagna / G. Darmanin Demajo. ASM. 4(1934)2-4(Apr.-Dic.65-96)

References

Palaces in Valletta
Buildings and structures completed in 1575
Buildings and structures demolished in 1839
19th-century disestablishments in Malta
Demolished buildings and structures in Malta
Limestone buildings in Malta
Bakeries of Malta
Mannerist architecture in Malta
Knights Hospitaller
Sovereign Military Order of Malta

Residential buildings completed in the 16th century